Charles "Chuck" Jordan is an American game designer, writer, and programmer. He co-wrote The Curse of Monkey Island, wrote three episodes of Sam & Max Save the World, was the lead writer and co-designer of Sam & Max Beyond Time and Space, designed and co-wrote two episodes of Strong Bad's Cool Game for Attractive People, and was the designer of Sam & Max: The Devil's Playhouse: The Penal Zone, as well as season lead designer for the Sam & Max: The Devil's Playhouse season on the whole.

Career
Chuck Jordan began his career at LucasArts as a programmer and co-writer of The Curse of Monkey Island in 1997.  After working on Grim Fandango as a script programmer, he left the company.  He later joined Infinite Machine, a start-up company founded by LucasArts alumni, where he worked on the initial design of their games, including the cancelled Sam & Max Plunge Through Space.

After Infinite Machine closed, he joined Telltale Games as a writer and designer in 2007.  While at Telltale, he co-wrote several episodes for their adventure game seasons.  In 2008, he was the lead writer and co-designer of Sam & Max Beyond Time & Space.  He also wrote and co-directed the first episode of that season, Penal Zone, and wrote and designed the finale The City That Dares Not Sleep.  He finished his tenure at Telltale Games as season lead designer of Sam & Max: The Devil's Playhouse in 2010.  He also wrote Puzzle Agent 2. That game came out in 2011, the year following his departure from Telltale.

Games
1997 The Curse of Monkey Island, programmer, co-writer (LucasArts)
1998 Grim Fandango, script programmer (LucasArts)
2002 New Legends, designer (Infinite Machine)
2003 Simcity 4, programmer (Electronic Arts)
2007 Sam & Max Save the World: Abe Lincoln Must Die!, Reality 2.0 and Bright Side of the Moon, writer (Telltale Games)
2008 Sam & Max Beyond Time and Space, lead writer, co-designer (Telltale Games)
2008 Strong Bad's Cool Game for Attractive People: Strong Badia the Free and 8-Bit is Enough, designer, co-writer (Telltale Games)
2010 Sam & Max: The Devil's Playhouse, lead writer, co-designer (writer, co-director The Penal Zone, writer, designer The City That Dares Not Sleep) (Telltale Games)
2011 Puzzle Agent 2, writer (Telltale Games)
2012 The Walking Dead, story consultant, writer (Telltale Games)
2014 Tales From the Borderlands, writer (Telltale Games)

References

External links
 

American video game designers
American video game directors
Living people
Video game programmers
Video game writers
1971 births